William Penn Fyve were a garage rock group from Palo Alto, California who recorded the psychedelic classic "Swami". Their membership included Gregg Rolie and Mickey Hart.

Background
The group started out in late 1964 at the College of San Mateo calling themselves The DiscCounts. The original founding lineup was made up of Ron Cox on drums, Mike Dunn on guitar, Neil Holtmann on vocals, and Steve Sweet on bass. The group had a similar visual style to that of Paul Revere & the Raiders revolutionary attire. With the exposure by Radio KYA, KFRC and KLIV, the group was one of the San Francisco Bay Area's most well-known popular groups at the time and were star attractions in their own shows. They opened for some major national as well as international acts. One long term member was Gregg Rolie who would later be in Santana and Journey. Mickey Hart was also a member of the band at one stage. The one single they released, "Swami" is considered a pop / psychedelic classic. They are also referred to as William Penn and His Pals.

Similarly named groups
There may be some confusion over similarly named groups from the same era. There was one group around at the same time with a similar name, William Penn & the Quakers who had a few singles including "California Sun" released on Len Stark's Philadelphia based Melron label. It is apparently a different group. There was also another similarly named band, Wm Penn and the Quakers who recorded for Twilight Records and for the Duane Records label from Sunnyvale, California.

Career
In early 1965, with the current line up of  Ron Cox, Mike Dunn, Neil Holtmann, and Steve Sweet, they added another member, keyboard player Dave Lovell. A few months after that, there were some changes to their line up and guitarist Mike Shapiro and bassist Steve Leidenthal came on board, replacing Mike Dunn and Steve Sweet. Then they changed their look to the revolutionary style. 
In 1966 Gregg Rolie came into the group, replacing Dave Lovell.  Also that year, they auditioned for Scorpio Records but were unsuccessful in their bid. Neil Holtmann was also fired from the group that year. A song about a guru during a hallucination was written and became the song "Swami". In 1966 or 1967, their single "Swami" / "Blow My Mind" was released on Thunderbird 502.

They broke up around 1967 / 1968 after having an argument with Vern Justus over finances.

Greg Rollie later joined The Santana Blues Band after Carlos Santana caught them at the Longshoremen's Hall in San Francisco and asked him to join the new band he was putting together.

A CD album with early recorded material was released in the 2000s which included an alt-version of "Blow My Mind". It is believed that Mickey Hart plays drums on that version. Two of their songs, "Blow My Mind" and "Swami" are included on the Trash various artists CD compilation.

Line up

Version #1
 Ron Cox ... drums
 Mike Dunn ... guitar
 Neil Holtmann ... vocals
 Dave Lovell ... Keyboards
 Steve Sweet ... bass

Following versions
 Ron Cox ... drums
 Mickey Hart ... drums
 Neil Holtmann ... vocals
 Dave Lovell ... keyboards
 Gregg Rolie ... keyboards, vocals
 Mike Shapiro ... guitar
 Steve Leidenthal ... bass
 Jack Shelton ... guitar

Discography

References

External links
 Cosmic Mind at Play: Classic Singles #96: The William Penn Fyve – Swami / Blow My Mind (1966)
 William Penn and His Pals
 Rockasteria William Penn And His Pals - William Penn And His Pals (1966 us, remarkable garage psych, with Gregg Rolie pre Santana)
 The San Francisco Sound: WILLIAM PENN AND HIS PALS FAMILY TREE

Thunderbird Records artists
Psychedelic rock music groups from California